Kate Elizabeth Hansen (born June 9, 1992) is an American luger who has competed since 2003. In 2008, she became the youngest Junior World Champion, at age fifteen.

Career
Hansen has been competing since 2003. She would practice luge in California by riding a skateboard down hills on her back. In 2008, at the age of fifteen, she was the youngest-ever Junior World Champion. She has been on the United States National Team since 2007, and she finished 16th in the women's singles at a World Cup event in Calgary on November 21, 2009. Hansen won the USA Luge National Championship in October 2013 with a broken foot. In January 2014 she was the U.S. Olympic Committee's athlete of the month. She finished 10th place in the Sochi 2014 Olympics.

Sochi 2014
Hansen appeared in the Olympics for the first time at Sochi 2014, where she had a 10th-place finish with a time of 3 minutes 22.667 seconds.

Personal life
Hansen is a Mormon and currently attends Brigham Young University. She took a year off to attend the Olympics. She graduated from La Cañada High School. She resides in La Cañada Flintridge, California.

Hansen is a fan of Beyoncé and listens to her exclusively while warming up for her races. She warms up by dancing, which became her trademark during the Sochi 2014 Olympics. The official Facebook page of Beyonce posted the link to her dance warmup before Hansen's final race in the Sochi 2014 luge event, wishing her luck. The dance apparently came about after she broke her foot and had trouble running to warm up.

Hansen teamed up with Jimmy Kimmel in a prank video which made it seem that a wolf had broken into the apartment where she was staying. A few days later, they admitted to the prank after having scared the media, as well as security.

References

FIL-Luge profile

External links

 
 
 
 
 
 
 

1992 births
Living people
Latter Day Saints from California
American female lugers
Sportspeople from Burbank, California
Lugers at the 2014 Winter Olympics
Olympic lugers of the United States
People from La Cañada Flintridge, California
American Ninja Warrior contestants
21st-century American women